The Bjølstad Farm is a farm in Heidal in the municipality of Sel in Innlandet county, Norway.

The farm was mentioned in written sources as early as 1270. Eirik Bjørnsson, who gradually purchased the farm in the 1430s, was the ancestor of the Bratt family, who lived at the farm for many generations. By 1680 it had developed into a scattered farming settlement with more than 26 leased-out properties and 700 buildings. One of its larger properties is the farm named Søre Lykkja ('South Lykkja'), also known as Bjølstadløkken, to the northwest. The Veslesetra property also belongs to the farm. The farm is privately owned.

The Bjølstad Chapel, now relocated at Heidal Church, is a timber-framed structure dating from 1531 that can accommodate 75 people. Its doorposts are believed to date from an earlier stave church and are decorated with Urnes Style carvings. For a time, the chapel was defunct and used as a stable and barn.

Nine buildings at the Bjølstad Farm received protected status under the Cultural Heritage Act of 1920.

The farm served as the site where the 1959 Austrian film Und ewig singen die Wälder (The Forests Sing Forever) was filmed. It was based on Trygve Gulbranssen's 1933 book Og bakom synger skogene (Beyond Sing the Woods). In 1970, to mark the 850th anniversary of the Bratt family, over 2,000 members of the Bratt family met at a reunion at the farm and set up a memorial stone there.

A separate illustrated chapter is dedicated to Bjølstad in the 1882 travelogue Three in Norway (by Two of Them):

References

External links

 Bjølstad Farm at the Directorate for Cultural Heritage website

Buildings and structures in Innlandet
Cultural heritage of Norway
Farms in Innlandet